This is a list of countries by population in 1939 (including any dependent, occupied or colonized territories for empires), providing an approximate overview of the world population before World War II.

Estimate numbers are from the beginning of the year, and exact population figures are for countries that were having a census in the year 1939 (which were on various dates in that year).

See also
List of countries by population
List of countries by population in 1900
List of countries by population in 1989
List of countries by population in 2000
List of countries by population in 2005
List of territories occupied by the United Kingdom
List of territories occupied by Imperial Japan

Notes

Constituents

References

Pop
1939